Segura is a small town and municipality in the Goierri region of the province of Gipuzkoa in the autonomous community of the Basque Country in northern Spain.

References

External links
 Official Website 
 SEGURA in the Bernardo Estornés Lasa - Auñamendi Encyclopedia (Euskomedia Fundazioa) 

Municipalities in Gipuzkoa